A constitutional referendum was held in Zambia on 17 June 1969. The referendum proposed amending the constitution to remove the requirement for future amendments of clauses protecting fundamental rights to go to a public referendum, and instead require only a two-thirds majority in the National Assembly. The referendum was passed with 85% voting in favour of the change. Voter turnout was 69.5%.

Results

References

Zambian constitutional referendum
Constitutional referendum
Zambian constitutional referendum
1969
Constitutional referendums